The JDC International Centre for Community Development (JDC-ICCD) is a research organization and think tank based in Oxford University, Oxford, United Kingdom. The charity, founded by the American Jewish Joint Distribution Committee (JDC), "is devoted to understanding and analyzing transformations in Europe and their impact on European Jewish communities."

The JDC-ICCD was founded 10 January 2005 to provide education and training, for religious activities, to prevent or relieve poverty, to encourage community and economic development, to perform or sponsor research, and to be an advocate.

Activities

2011 survey of European Jewish leaders
In 2011, Trinity College of Hartford, Connecticut, led by the American JDC-ICCD, conducted a survey of European Jewish leaders to ascertain concerns and challenges faced by European Jewish communities, including antisemitism, leadership, intermarriage and status issues, and Europe and Israel.

2013 Berlin Conference
JDC-ICCD partnered with the American Jewish Committee's (AJC) Berlin Ramer Institute for German-Jewish Relations to host a conference October 25–27, 2013 titled "Analyzing Jewish Europe Today: Perspectives from a New Generation." Attendees and presenters gathered to discuss new Jewish cultural trends, Muslim-Jewish relations and Jewish revival in Eastern and Central Europe.

References

Further reading

External links
 Official site

Jewish organisations based in the United Kingdom
Think tanks based in the United Kingdom
Judaism in the United Kingdom
Interculturalism
Organisations based in Oxford
2005 establishments in the United Kingdom
Jewish organizations established in 2005